Tomas Jack-Kurdyla  is a professional Canadian football offensive lineman for the Edmonton Elks of the Canadian Football League (CFL). He played college football for the Buffalo Bulls from 2016 to 2019.

Early life and high school career
Jack-Kurdyla grew up in Montreal, Quebec. He played against his eventual Edmonton teammate, Mathieu Betts. He attended Vanier College in Montreal. He worked at several jobs while growing up, including at a Provigo grocery store, AMC movie theatre, Vanier Sports Complex, as a mover and lawnmower.

College career
Jack-Kurdyla spent four seasons on the offensive line at Buffalo. As a freshman, he started eight games for the Bulls. Jack-Kurdyla started every game of his sophomore season and was named Academic All-MAC as well as CoSIDA Academic All-District. As a senior in 2019, he started 11 games at right guard. He helped the offensive line allow a program-low eight sacks and helped set a school record in rushing yards with 3,256. Jack-Kurdyla started 40 games in his college career. At the Buffalo pro day, Jack-Kurdyla did 18 reps of 225 pounds on the bench press and posted a 23-inch vertical leap, eight-foot, three-inch broad jump, 5.35 time in the 40-yard sprint and 4.75 shuttle.

Professional career
Jack-Kurdyla was drafted fourth overall in the 2020 CFL Draft by the Edmonton Eskimos. He became the highest-drafted Buffalo player in the CFL. He did not play in 2020 due to the cancellation of the 2020 CFL season and was officially signed by the Edmonton Elks on February 17, 2021.

References

External links
 Edmonton bio
 Buffalo Bulls bio
 Twitter

1996 births
Living people
American football offensive guards
Buffalo Bulls football players
Canadian football offensive linemen
Canadian players of American football
Edmonton Elks players
Players of Canadian football from Quebec
Canadian football people from Montreal